The 2022 Rip Curl WSL Finals was the 11th and final event of the 2022 World Surf League. It was the second edition of the World Surf League Finals, and took place at Lower Trestles in California on September 8, 2022.

The men's event was won by Brazil's Filipe Toledo, while the women's event was won by Australia's Stephanie Gilmore.

Format

The event featured the top five surfers from both the men's and women's regular season standings, and consisted of four head-to-head matches, held on a single day. In the first match, the surfers ranked fourth and fifth went head-to-head, with the winner advancing to take on the third-ranked surfer in the second match. The winner of the second match then took on the second-ranked surfer in the third match, with the winner qualifying for the title match against the top-ranked surfer in the standings.

Results

Men

Draw

Title match

Women

Draw

Title match

References

External links

 World Surf League

World Surf League
Finals
World Surf League Finals
World Surf League Finals
World Surf League Finals
World Surf League Finals